The Richland Correctional Institution (RiCI) is a state prison for men located in Mansfield, Richland County, Ohio, owned and operated by the Ohio Department of Rehabilitation and Correction.  

The facility was opened in 1998, and houses a maximum of 2613 inmates at a mix of minimum and medium security levels.

References

Prisons in Ohio
Buildings and structures in Richland County, Ohio
1998 establishments in Ohio